Dillwynia rupestris is a species of flowering plant in the family Fabaceae and is endemic to the Gibraltar Range National Park in New South Wales. It is an erect, single-stemmed shrub with linear leaves and yellow flowers with red markings.

Description

Taxonomy and naming
Dillwynia rupestris was first formally described in 1999 by Peter C. Jobson and Peter H. Weston in the journal Telopea from specimens collected on the side of the Gwydir Highway in the Gibraltar Range National Park in 1998. The specific epithet (rupestris) means "rocky", referring to the preferred granite habitat of this species.

Distribution and habitat
This dillwynia grows in shrubland, forest or heath and is only known from the Gibraltar Range National Park.

References

rupestris
Flora of New South Wales
Plants described in 1999